The 2021–22 season was FC Van's second season in the Armenian Premier League.

Season events
On 31 May, Van announced the signing of Arman Meliksetyan.

On 28 June, Erik Azizyan joined Van on a season-long loan deal from Pyunik.

On 2 July, Van announced the signings of Aleksandr Stepanov from Lori and Dmitri Kuzkin from Zvezda St.Petersburg.

On 15 July, Van announced the signing of Luis Menezes from Paraná.

On 19 July, Van announced the signing of Vladimir Filippov from Zvezda St.Petersburg.

On 7 August, Van announced the signing of Ernist Batyrkanov from Kyzylzhar.

On 18 August, Van announced the signing of Bruno Miguel from Rio Preto.

On 17 September, Van announced the signings of Norik Mkrtchyan from Kaluga, and Pascal Chidi from Khor Fakkan.

On 13 October, Van announced the signing of Emile N'dri Koukou.

On 27 December, Bruno Miguel, Ededem Essien, Luis Menezes, Stéphane Adjouman, Mykola Tsyhan and Ernist Batyrkanov all left Van.

On 2 February, Van announced the departures of Andranik Voskanyan, Gagik Daghbashyan, Akhmed Jindoyan and Vahagn Ayvazyan.

On 4 February, Van announced the signing of Benik Hovhannisyan who'd previously left Noah and Shota Gvazava from Slutsk. The following day, 5 February, Kakha Kakhabrishvili joined from Locomotive Tbilisi.

On 7 February, Van announced the signing of Jaisen Clifford from Cape Town All Stars, and free agent Edvard Avagyan.

On 9 February, Van announced the signings of Narek Hovhannisyan from Ararat-Armenia II and Ipehe Williams.

On 14 February, Van announced the signing of Silvio Gutierrez from Club Deportivo Estudiantes in Ecuador.

On 16 February, Van announced the signing of Domenico Coppola, whilst Emile N'dri Koukou and Norik Mkrtchyan left the club.

On 1 March, Van announced the signing of Alikhan Malkanduev from Shakhter Pietrykaw and Tengiz Tsikaridze from Zhetysu.

On 11 March, Van announced the signing of Benjamin Techie, who'd previously played in Armenia for Noravank.

On 16 March, Van announced the signing of Layonel Adams from Turan.

On 25 March, Van announced the signing of Jaber Issa from Al Raed.

Squad

Transfers

In

Loans in

Out

Released

Friendlies

Competitions

Overall record

Premier League

Results summary

Results by round

Results

Table

Armenian Cup

Statistics

Appearances and goals

|-
|colspan="16"|Players away on loan:
|-
|colspan="16"|Players who left Van during the season:

|}

Goal scorers

Clean sheets

Disciplinary Record

References

FC Van
Van